Wilson Zhang (also Zhang Peng, ; born 23 September 1979 in Anda, Heilongjiang, People's Republic of China) is a Canadian table tennis player of Chinese origin. As of January 2010, Zhang is ranked no. 140 in the world by the International Table Tennis Federation (ITTF). He is right-handed, and uses the shakehand grip.

In 2003, Zhang moved with his family to Richmond, British Columbia, Canada, where he worked as a full-time table tennis coach at the Bridgeport Sports Club. He also met and married a Canadian and now has two children, and finally resided to Ottawa, Ontario, where he obtained a citizenship four years later, and eventually trained for the National Table Tennis Centre under his personal and head coach Marles Martins. Zhang also reigned as Canadian table tennis champion for three straight years (2005–2007), finished second at the 2007 U.S. Open in Las Vegas, Nevada, and most significantly, attained the championship title at the North American Tour finals.

Zhang earned a spot on the Canadian team for the 2008 Summer Olympics in Beijing, by placing second over his teammate Pradeeban Peter-Paul in the men's singles from the North American Qualification Tournament in Vancouver. Zhang joined with his fellow players Peter-Paul and Qiang Zhen for the inaugural men's team event. His team placed fourth in the preliminary pool round, against Germany, Croatia, and Singapore, receiving a total of three points and three straight losses. In the men's singles, Zhang defeated Trinidad and Tobago's Dexter St. Louis in the preliminary round, before losing his next match to Japan's Seiya Kishikawa, attaining a set score of 2–4.

References

External links
 
 
 Profile – Canadian Olympic Team
 NBC 2008 Olympics profile 

1979 births
Living people
Canadian male table tennis players
Table tennis players at the 2008 Summer Olympics
Olympic table tennis players of Canada
Chinese emigrants to Canada
Canadian sportspeople of Chinese descent
Table tennis players from Heilongjiang
Sportspeople from Ottawa
People from Anda
Naturalised table tennis players